The Eternal Dance is a compilation album by American band Earth, Wind & Fire issued in September 1992 on Columbia Records.

Critical reception

J.D. Considine of The Baltimore Sun declared that "though this set shows off all sides of the EWF sound, its reliance on outtakes and unreleased live material underscores just how much instrumental sparkle this crew could muster."
Ann Powers of The New York Times noted "a fan's attention may fade over the course of the album's four hours; but this music always meant to make memories, sounds as nice in the background as it does up close". Stephen Thomas Erlewine of AllMusic called the box set "essential for hardcore Earth, Wind & Fire fans"

Patricia Smith of The Boston Globe also placed The Eternal Dance on her lists of the top ten recordings of both 1992 and 1993.

Track listing 

Key
(*)    Previously unreleased
(**)   Portions previously unreleased
(***)  Additional unreleased intro
(****) Released as B-side and international editions of Heritage
(^)    Previously unavailable on album

Accolades

References

Earth, Wind & Fire compilation albums
1992 compilation albums
Albums produced by Maurice White
Albums produced by Joe Wissert
Albums produced by Charles Stepney
Columbia Records compilation albums